This is a list of diplomatic missions of El Salvador, excluding honorary consulates. El Salvador is a small Central American country with a modest number of diplomatic missions abroad.

Africa

 Rabat (Embassy)

Americas

 Buenos Aires (Embassy)

 Belmopan (Embassy)

 La Paz (Embassy)

 Brasília (Embassy)

 Ottawa (Embassy)
 Calgary (Consulate-General)
 Montreal (Consulate-General)
 Toronto (Consulate-General)
 Vancouver (Consulate-General)

 Santiago de Chile (Embassy)

 Bogotá (Embassy)

 San José (Embassy)

Havana (Embassy)

 Santo Domingo (Embassy)

 Quito (Embassy)

 Guatemala City (Embassy)

 Tegucigalpa (Embassy)
 Choluteca (Consulate-General)
 San Pedro Sula (Consulate-General)

 Mexico City (Embassy)
 Acayucan (Consulate-General)
 Ciudad Juárez (Consulate-General)
 Guadalajara (Consulate-General)
 Monterrey (Consulate-General)
 Oaxaca City (Consulate-General)
 San Luis Potosí (Consulate)
 Tapachula (Consulate-General)
 Tijuana (Consulate-General)
 Villahermosa (Consulate-General)

 Managua (Embassy)

 Panama City (Embassy)

 Lima (Embassy)

 Port of Spain (Embassy)

 Washington, D.C. (Embassy)
 Aurora, Colorado (Consulate-General)
 Boston, Massachusetts (Consulate-General)
 Brentwood, New York (Consulate-General)
 Charlotte, North Carolina (Consulate-General)
 Chicago, Illinois (Consulate-General)
 Dallas, Texas (Consulate-General)
 Doral, Florida (Consulate-General)
 Duluth, Georgia (Consulate-General)
 Elizabeth, New Jersey (Consulate-General)
 El Paso, Texas (Consulate-General)
 Fresno, California (Consulate-General)
 Houston, Texas (Consulate-General)
 Laredo, Texas (Consulate-General)
 Las Vegas, Nevada (Consulate-General)
 Los Angeles, California (Consulate-General)
 McAllen, Texas (Consulate-General)
 Nashville, Tennessee (Consulate-General)
 New York City (Consulate-General)
 Omaha, Nebraska (Consulate-General)
 Saint Paul, Minnesota (Consulate-General)
 San Bernardino, California (Consulate-General)
 San Francisco, California (Consulate-General)
 Seattle, Washington (Consulate-General)
 Silver Spring, Maryland (Consulate-General)
 Springdale, Arkansas (Consulate-General)
 Tucson, Arizona (Consulate-General)
 Woodbridge, Virginia (Consulate-General)

 Montevideo (Embassy)

Asia

 Beijing (Embassy)

 New Delhi (Embassy)

 Tel Aviv (Embassy)

 Tokyo (Embassy)

 Doha (Embassy)

 Seoul (Embassy)

 Ankara (Embassy)

 Hanoi (Embassy)

Europe

 Vienna (Embassy)

 Brussels (Embassy)

 Paris (Embassy)

 Berlin (Embassy)

 Rome (Embassy)

 Rome (Embassy)
 Milan (Consulate-General)

 The Hague (Embassy)

 Oslo (Embassy)

 Lisbon (Embassy)

 Moscow (Embassy)

 Madrid (Embassy)
 Barcelona (Consulate-General)
 Seville (Consulate-General)

 Stockholm (Embassy)

 London (Embassy)

Oceania

 Canberra (Embassy)
 Melbourne (Consulate-General)

Multilateral organizations
 
New York City (Permanent Mission)
Geneva (Permanent Mission)
 
Paris (Permanent Mission)
  Food and Agriculture Organization
Rome (Permanent Mission)
 
Washington, D.C. (Permanent Mission)

Gallery

Closed missions

 Taipei (Embassy) (closed in 2018)

 Caracas (Embassy) (closed in 2019)

See also

 Foreign relations of El Salvador
 List of diplomatic missions in El Salvador
 Salvadoran passport

Notes

References

External links
Ministry of Foreign Affairs of El Salvador 

 
El Salvador
Diplomatic missions